Todd Krumm (born December 18, 1965) is a former American football defensive back. He played for the Chicago Bears in 1988 and for the Orlando Thunder in 1992.

References

1965 births
Living people
American football defensive backs
Michigan State Spartans football players
Chicago Bears players
Orlando Thunder players